Gil Cain (born March 5, 1988, in Brazil) is an Israeli professional footballer who is currently contracted with Maccabi Kabilio Jaffa. Local media outlets considered him to be a future star for that team.

Playing career
At the age of seven, Cain joined the youth system of Maccabi Tel Aviv. At the age of thirteen, he left Maccabi to join Hakoah Maccabi Ramat Gan but returned to "the yellows" two years later. During this time, he played for numerous Israeli national youth football teams. In 2006, Cain could have joined the full side for Maccabi, but instead played with the under-21 side in the national under-21 league. When he realised that his chances of breaking into the lineup were slim, he decided to leave the club. Gabby Ketzara, chairman of Hapoel Kfar Saba, was quick to ask manager Eli Ohana to give Cain a trial. After watching Cain play, Ohana signed him to a contract for three years with "the greens of the Sharon region."

Cain made his first team debut against Maccabi Haifa, coming in as a substitute for veteran Ofer Talker in the twenty-third minute of the match with Kfar Saba down two-nil. His debut was marred by his scoring an own goal in ninetieth minute, and Kfar Saba losing 3-0 to Haifa.

Personal life
Two weeks after Cain was born, he was adopted by Miron and Pnina Cain, lawyers from Ramat Ef'al, a suburb of Ramat Gan. His brother was also adopted, having been born in Romania.

Footnotes

1988 births
Living people
Israeli footballers
Brazilian Jews
Association football defenders
Hapoel Kfar Saba F.C. players
Sektzia Ness Ziona F.C. players
Hapoel Marmorek F.C. players
Beitar Tel Aviv Bat Yam F.C. players
Hakoah Maccabi Amidar Ramat Gan F.C. players
Maccabi Jaffa F.C. players
Hapoel Azor F.C. players
Liga Leumit players
Israeli Premier League players
Brazilian emigrants to Israel
Footballers from Ramat Gan
Israeli people of Brazilian-Jewish descent